was a Japanese freestyle swimmer. While a student at Meiji University, he set national records over 200 m (2:14.6) and 400 m (4:50.4). He was selected for the 1932 Olympics and won a bronze medal in the 400 m event, despite suffering a severe bout of gastroenteritis before the Games.

References

Further reading

Lohn, John. Historical Dictionary of Competitive Swimming. Scarecrow Press, (2010). 

1913 births
1970 deaths
Sportspeople from Hiroshima
Meiji University alumni
Japanese male freestyle swimmers
Olympic swimmers of Japan
Swimmers at the 1932 Summer Olympics
Olympic bronze medalists for Japan
Olympic bronze medalists in swimming
Medalists at the 1932 Summer Olympics
20th-century Japanese people